Charles Steven Kress (December 9, 1921 – March 4, 2014) was an American professional baseball player and manager.

Biography
His seveteen-year active career was interrupted by three years' service in the United States Army during World War II (1943–1945). Kress was born in Philadelphia, where he attended Frankford High School. 

In MLB, he appeared in one full season, and parts of three others. In that full campaign, he began the year with the Reds, got into twenty-seven games, then was sold to the White Sox in June. In Chicago, he batted .278 in ninety-seven games with 104 hits and became the White Sox' regular first baseman. But only one of his hits was a home run, and after Kress began  by going hitless in eight at bats, he was sold to the St. Louis Cardinals' organization and returned to the minor leagues. A productive 1953 season (25 home runs, 121 runs batted in, and .321 batting average) earned him one further partial season in the majors, when he appeared in thirty-seven games for the Tigers and Dodgers and batted .163, largely as a pinch hitter. He played professionally into the 1959 season. 

In his 175 big-league games, Kress batted .249 with 116 hits, including twenty doubles. His lone MLB home run was a solo shot off the Tigers' Fred Hutchinson on July 1. 

As a minor leaguer, he got into 1,745 games and became a manager in the Tigers' and Philadelphia Phillies' farm systems. 

He retired from baseball in 1961, and moved to Rush Lake, Minnesota, in 1973, to St. Joseph, Missouri, in 1980, and to Sandpoint, Idaho, in 2002.

References

External links

1921 births
2014 deaths
Asheville Tourists managers
Ashland Colonels players
Baseball players from Philadelphia
Brooklyn Dodgers players
Buffalo Bisons (minor league) players
Charleston Senators players
Chicago White Sox players
Cincinnati Reds players
Columbia Reds players
Columbus Red Birds players
Cordele Reds players
Des Moines Demons players
Detroit Tigers players
Durham Bulls managers
Durham Bulls players
Erie Sailors players
Houston Buffaloes players
Lenoir Reds players
Major League Baseball first basemen
People from Otter Tail County, Minnesota
Sportspeople from St. Joseph, Missouri
People from Sandpoint, Idaho
Rochester Red Wings players
Syracuse Chiefs players
Toronto Maple Leafs (International League) players
Tulsa Oilers (baseball) players
United States Army personnel of World War II